"The Opera Song (Brave New World)" is a song by British record producer Jurgen Vries featuring vocals from Welsh singer Charlotte Church. Church was credited as CMC because her label was concerned about the press' reaction to the change in her musical direction. Released on 20 January 2003, the song reached number three on the UK Singles Chart the same month and was the 70th-best-selling single of the year there. The single also reached number 25 in Ireland and number 62 in Australia.

Music video
The music video for the song was animated and saw a computer-animated version of Charlotte Church running through a futuristic town to meet up with Jurgen Vries.

Track listings

UK CD1
 "The Opera Song (Brave New World)" (radio edit)
 "The Opera Song (Brave New World)" (extended mix)

UK CD2
 "The Opera Song (Brave New World)" (radio edit)
 "The Opera Song (Brave New World)" (dub mix)
 "The Opera Song (Brave New World)" (Darren Tate's classical rework)
 "The Opera Song (Brave New World)" (enhanced CD video)

UK 12-inch single
A. "The Opera Song (Brave New World)" (extended mix)
B. "The Opera Song (Brave New World)" (dub)

Australian CD single
 "The Opera Song (Brave New World)" (radio edit)
 "The Opera Song (Brave New World)" (Darren Tate's classical rework)
 "The Opera Song (Brave New World)" (extended mix)
 "The Opera Song (Brave New World)" (Magik Muzik mix)

Charts

Weekly charts

Year-end charts

References

External links
 Charlotte Church's website
 Official music video on youtube

2003 singles
2003 songs
Charlotte Church songs
Darren Tate songs